Jelle Geens (born 26 March 1993) is a Belgian triathlete. Geens placed 38th at the 2016 Olympics. Two years later he won a bronze medal in the mixed team relay event at the 2018 European Triathlon Championships. He studied industrial engineering at Groep T in Leuven.

References

External links
 

1993 births
Living people
Belgian male triathletes
Olympic triathletes of Belgium
Triathletes at the 2016 Summer Olympics
Place of birth missing (living people)
Triathletes at the 2020 Summer Olympics